Ralph Walker Nickless (born May 28, 1947) is an American prelate in the Roman Catholic Church. He has been serving as bishop of the Diocese of Sioux City in Iowa since 2005.

Biography
Ralph Nickless was born on May 28, 1947, in Denver, Colorado, one of ten children born to R. Walker Nickless, Sr. and E. Margaret (McGovern) Nickless. He graduated from Bishop Machebeuf High School in Denver in 1965. He then attended St. Thomas Seminary in Denver and the University of Denver. Nickless eventually went to the Pontifical Gregorian University in Rome.

Priesthood 
Nickless was ordained a priest by Archbishop James Casey for the Archdiocese of Denver on August 4, 1973. Nickless then served as pastor of Our Lady of Fatima Parish in Lakewood, Colorado and as vicar general of the archdiocese.

Bishop of Sioux City
Nickless was appointed as the seventh bishop of the Diocese of Sioux City on November 10, 2005, by Pope Benedict XVI. He was consecrated on January 20, 2006, at the Church of the Nativity of Our Lord Jesus Christ in Sioux City. Archbishop Jerome Hanus was the principal consecrator with Archbishop Charles Chaput and Bishop Thomas Tobin as the co-consecrators.

On February 27, 2019, Nickless released a list of 28 priests with credible accusations of sexual abuse of minors, going back to the founding of the diocese in 1902. 

In October 2013, it was reported that the diocese had withheld information from parishioners regarding the arrest of one of their priests, John Wind, five years earlier. During that incident, Wind was meeting with a female parishioner at a bakery. While there, he threatened to drop his pants and sexually assault the woman. After she called the police, they found Wind on a street corner half-naked. During his arrest, Wind punched an officer and was subdued with a taser.  Wind later pleaded guilty to misdemeanor disorderly conduct, was sent away for mental health treatment, and then returned to parish work.  His parish was not notified of the incident.

In May 2022, having reached the mandatory retirement age of 75 for bishops, Nickless submitted his resignation as bishop of the Diocese of Sioux City to Pope Francis I.

Viewpoints

Health Care 
In August 2009, Nickless stated that "the Catholic Church does not teach that government should directly provide health care." Rather, he wrote,"[t]he proper role of the government is to regulate the private sector, in order to foster healthy competition and to curtail abuses. Therefore any legislation that undermines the viability of the private sector is suspect."

Contraception 
In February, 2012, Nickless spoke during a webcast sponsored by the Family Research Council.  In it, he characterized an Obama Administration initiative to require health insurers to provide birth control coverage as having been sponsored by "the power of evil," and called for "followers of the light" to "stand up and vehemently oppose this."

White Nationalism 
On January 16, 2019, Nickless reacted to comments made by then US Congressman Steven King, calling them "totally inappropriate". King had defended white nationalism and white supremacy in public statements.

See also

 Catholic Church hierarchy
 Catholic Church in the United States
 Historical list of the Catholic bishops of the United States
 List of Catholic bishops of the United States
 Lists of patriarchs, archbishops, and bishops

References

External links
 Roman Catholic Diocese of Sioux City Official Site

Episcopal succession

1947 births
Living people
21st-century Roman Catholic bishops in the United States
Roman Catholic bishops of Sioux City
People from Denver
Roman Catholic Archdiocese of Denver
Religious leaders from Colorado
Catholics from Colorado